American College of Education is a private, online for-profit college based in Indianapolis, Indiana, focused on education, healthcare, and nursing. American College of Education is a certified B Corporation, and a subsidiary of ACE Holdco PBC of Dallas, Texas.

American College of Education confers degrees in a variety of programs, including a Master of Education in Educational Leadership, Master of Education in Curriculum and Instruction, Master of Education in Early Childhood Education, and a Master of Education in Educational Technology. Ed.D. and Ed.S. in Leadership degrees were launched in 2013. A Bachelor's in Healthcare Administration was added in 2017, and a RN to MSN program followed in 2018. The American College of Education RN to MSN program is an accelerated program for registered nurses to earn a bachelor's degree on the way to a Master of Science in Nursing. All courses are taught online.

History

American College of Education was formally incorporated in Illinois on February 25, 2005. Following incorporation, it
purchased the intellectual property (the academic programming) of Barat College. American College of Education
immediately applied to The Higher Learning Commission to
continue the accreditation of Barat College under its new name and ownership. The Higher Learning Commission
approved this request in March 2006.

In August 2015, The Higher Learning Commission awarded American College of Education its 10-year re-accreditation, securing the college's accreditation through 2025.

In March 2016, American College of Education announced a partnership with the National Institute for STEM Education (NISE) and Accelerate Learning, inventors of STEMScopes, to provide a pathway to STEM certification and degree programs. Educators who earn the National Certificate for STEM Teaching from NISE are able to transfer their certificate coursework to American College of Education to complete an M.Ed. in STEM Leadership.

In September 2016, American College of Education received its Certified B Corporation distinction from the nonprofit B Lab, becoming the first and only Certified B Corp and Benefit Corporation in the state of Indiana. American College of Education was recognized for its partnership with nonprofits like Kids in Need Foundation and Teachers' Treasures, and its donation drives for organizations like Feeding America and Indianapolis School of Wheels.

Following its B Corporation certification, American College of Education was awarded the 2017 Best Places to Work distinction by the Indiana Chamber of Commerce for its dynamic work environment and progressive workplace policies. They received the award again in 2018 and 2019. In 2018, American College of Education also received the When Work Works Award from the Society for Human Resource Management for exceptional employee satisfaction.

In support of its expanding healthcare offerings, American College of Education announced a transfer agreement with Ivy Tech Community College in April 2018, allowing Ivy Tech students who earn associate of science or associate of applied science degrees in the School of Health Sciences to transfer to American College of Education to complete a Bachelor of Science in Healthcare Administration.

In June 2018, the college formally announced its intention to expand into the nursing field with the RN to MSN program, a pathway program that allows registered nurses to complete both a Bachelor of Science in Nursing and a Master of Science in Nursing degree in a three-year span. The first cohort of the nursing program sat during the August 2018 term.

In February 2019, a Master of Special Education was added to the college's program offerings.

Academics
American College of Education offers master's degrees, doctoral and specialist degree programs, and a bachelor's degree completion program in Healthcare Administration. The college also offers several graduate-level certificates, including programs in English as a Second Language and Bilingual Education, Content Area Instruction, and Virtual Instruction.

The college is accredited by the Higher Learning Commission (HLC). The Professional Education Programs (M.Ed. in Educational Leadership, M.Ed. in Curriculum and Instruction, M.Ed. in English as a Second Language and Bilingual Education, M.Ed. in Educational Technology) are also accredited by the Council for the Accreditation of Educator Preparation (CAEP). Nursing programs are accredited by the Commission on Collegiate Nursing Education (CCNE).

References

External links
 Official website

For-profit universities and colleges in the United States
Distance education institutions based in the United States
Educational institutions established in 2005
Universities and colleges in Indianapolis
Private universities and colleges in Indiana
Schools of education in Indiana
B Lab-certified corporations
2005 establishments in Indiana